Sandro da Silva Mendonça (born 1 October 1983 in Brazil), or simply Sandro is a Brazilian football player who plays as an attacking midfielder.

Club career

Kedah

On 9 April 2015 Sandro signed a contract with Malaysian side club Kedah. He made 27 appearances and 17 goals during his season debut.

Career statistics

Club

Honours

Club
Kedah FA
Malaysia Premier League  : 2015
 Malaysia FA Cup : 2017
 Malaysia Cup : 2016
 Malaysia Charity Shield : 2017

Individual
PFAM Player of the Month: September 2015

References

External links
 
 
 Guardian Stats Centre
 
 

1983 births
Living people
Sarawak United FC players
Paraná Clube players
Avaí FC players
Coritiba Foot Ball Club players
Gençlerbirliği S.K. footballers
Hacettepe S.K. footballers
Sivasspor footballers
Daegu FC players
Brazilian footballers
Brazilian expatriate footballers
Brazilian expatriate sportspeople in Turkey
Brazilian expatriate sportspeople in South Korea
Expatriate footballers in Turkey
Expatriate footballers in South Korea
Süper Lig players
K League 1 players
Malaysia Super League players
Malaysia Premier League players
Association football midfielders
Sportspeople from Fortaleza